The Silence of Dean Maitland is a 1934 Australian film directed by Ken G. Hall, and based on Maxwell Gray's 1886 novel of the same name. It was one of the most popular Australian films of the 1930s.

Plot
Cyril Maitland is a clergyman living in a small seaside town, who impregnates the beautiful Alma Lee despite being engaged to another woman. When Alma's father Ben finds out about the pregnancy, he attacks Maitland and is killed in a fall. Mailtand's best friend, Doctor Henry Everard, gets the blame, and spends twenty years in jail while Maitland's career thrives.

Cast
 John Longden as Dean Maitland
 Charlotte Francis as Alma Lee
 Jocelyn Howarth as Alma Gray
 John Warwick as Dr Henry Everard
 John Pickard as Tommy Everard
 Bill Kerr as Cyril Maitland Jnr
 Fred MacDonald as Granfer
George Lloyd as Granfer
Claude Turton as Charlie Gray
W. Lane Bayliff as Reverend Maitanld Snr
Les Warton as Ben Lee
Leal Douglas as Mrs Lee

Production

Development
The script was based on a play adapted from a popular novel by Maxwell Gray which had previously been filmed in 1914. The rights to the play were owned by a friend of Stuart F. Doyle's, Joe Lippmann. Hall and Doyle went to see a production of the play at the Rockdale Amateur Society and "ended up in a fit of controllable laughter." However Hall recognised that the basic structure of the piece was solid. He arranged for the play to be adapted into a screenplay by ABC radio writer Edmund Barclay and an old friend of Hall's Gayne Dexter

Casting
The film was meant to be Cinesound's follow up to On Our Selection but Hall had trouble finding appropriate actors to play the leads, and so made The Squatter's Daughter instead. Eventually, John Longden and Charlotte Francis, English actors touring Australia in a play, were cast. Jocelyn Howarth, who had leapt to fame in The Squatter's Daughter, was given a support role.

Longden was paid £60 a week, a relatively high fee for Australian films.

Shooting
The movie was shot on location in Camden and at Cinesound's studios in Bondi. Filming took ten weeks.

Release

Censorship troubles
Ken G. Hall ran into trouble with the censor over scenes where Charlotte Francis swims on the beach and later seduces the clergyman. However, Cinesound appealed and these scenes ended up staying in the final film. A brief shot in which Alma's towel slips while she is changing was removed.

Box office
Released on a double bill with the variety short Cinesound Varieties, the film was highly popular at the local box office and achieved release in England; in fact, Hall says box office receipts were higher in England than in Australia.

By the end of 1934 The Silence of Dean Maitland had earned an estimated £22,000 at the Australian box office and a profit of £4,300; in 1952 Hall claimed the film had earned just under £50,000 in Australia.

The movie was being screened in cinemas as late as 1940.

Critical
The movie came second place in a 1935 Commonwealth film competition, winning £1,250. First prize went to Heritage (1935). The judges said the film:
Had well-acted passages of strong drama. The continuity was workmanlike, music was judiciously used, and some of the outdoor scenes were very pleasant. The story was its weakest point, because of the old-fashioned melodrama,
bristling with Improbabilities and often over-sentimental.

The intention was for Cinesound to follow this movie with an adaptation of Robbery Under Arms but uncertainty over whether films about bushrangers were still banned led the company to make Strike Me Lucky (1934) instead.

References

External links
The Silence of Dean Maitland in the Internet Movie Database
The Silence of Dean Maitland at Australian Screen Online
The Silence of Dean Maitland at National Film and Sound Archive
The Silence of Dean Maitland original text of Maxwell Gray novel at Project Gutenberg
The Silence of Dean Maitland at Oz Movies

1933 films
Films directed by Ken G. Hall
Films based on British novels
Australian films based on plays
Films based on adaptations
Australian drama films
1933 drama films
Australian black-and-white films
1930s English-language films
1930s Australian films
Cinesound Productions films